In 2017, the  participated in the Currie Cup First Division and the Rugby Challenge competitions. The  team played in the Under-21 Provincial Championship and the  team in the Under-19 Provincial Championship.

Currie Cup

Squad

The Eastern Province Kings squad for the Currie Cup was:

Standings

Round-by-round

Matches

Player statistics

The appearance record for players that represented the Eastern Province Kings in the 2017 Currie Cup First Division is as follows:

(c) denotes the team captain. For each match, the player's squad number is shown. Starting players are numbered 1 to 15, while the replacements are numbered 16 to 22. "App" refers to the number of appearances made by the player, "Try" to the number of tries scored by the player, "Kck" to the number of points scored via kicks (conversions, penalties or drop goals) and "Pts" refer to the total number of points scored by the player.

 Tango Balekile, Eben Barnard, Brandon Brown, Quewin Gawie, Gerrit Huisamen and Lindokuhle Welemu did not make any appearances.

Rugby Challenge

Squad

The Eastern Province Kings squad for the Rugby Challenge was:

Standings

The final log for the 2017 Rugby Challenge was:

Round-by-round

Matches

Player statistics

The appearance record for players that represented the Eastern Province Kings in the 2017 Rugby Challenge is as follows:

(c) denotes the team captain. For each match, the player's squad number is shown. Starting players are numbered 1 to 15, while the replacements are numbered 16 to 22. "App" refers to the number of appearances made by the player, "Try" to the number of tries scored by the player, "Kck" to the number of points scored via kicks (conversions, penalties or drop goals) and "Pts" refer to the total number of points scored by the player.

 Matt Howes, Vaughen Isaacs, Thapelo Molapo, Sibusiso Ngcokovane, Mabhutana Peter and Janse Roux did not make any appearances.

See also

 Eastern Province Elephants

Notes

References

2017
2017 Currie Cup
2017 in South African rugby union